Freienbach–Hurden Rosshorn is one of the 111 serial sites of the UNESCO World Heritage Site Prehistoric pile dwellings around the Alps, of which are 56 located in Switzerland.

Geography 
The site is located on Zürichsee lakeshore in Hurden, a locality of the municipality of Freienbach in the Canton of Schwyz in Switzerland. Situated at the Seedamm, an isthmus between the Zürichsee and the Obersee lake area, it was in close vicinity to the prehistoric lake crossings, neighbored by three other Prehistoric pile dwelling settlements: Freienbach–Hurden Rosshorn, Freienbach–Hurden Seefeld, Rapperswil-Jona/Hombrechtikon–Feldbach and Rapperswil-Jona–Technikum. The settlement comprises , and the buffer zone including the lake area comprises  in all.

Description 
Freienbach–Hurden Rosshorn provides early evidence of transport routes combined with special metal finds interpreted as sacrificial offerings. The site includes several lake crossings beginning in the Horgen culture. Several Early Bronze Age construction phases have been identified, as well as remains from the Hallstatt culture and Roman era providing dendrochronological dates about periods from which no other sites are known.

Protection 
As well as being part of the 56 Swiss sites of the UNESCO World Heritage Site Prehistoric pile dwellings around the Alps, the settlement is also listed in the Swiss inventory of cultural property of national and regional significance as a Class A object of national importance. Hence, the area is provided as a historical site under federal protection, within the meaning of the Swiss Federal Act on the nature and cultural heritage (German: Bundesgesetz über den Natur- und Heimatschutz NHG) of 1 July 1966. Unauthorised researching and purposeful gathering of findings represent a criminal offense according to Art. 24.

See also 
 Prehistoric pile dwellings around Zürichsee

Literature 
 Peter J. Suter, Helmut Schlichtherle et al.: Pfahlbauten – Palafittes – Palafitte. Palafittes, Biel 2009. .
 Beat Eberschweiler: Ur- und frühgeschichtliche Verkehrswege über den Zürichsee: Erste Ergebnisse aus den Taucharchäologischen Untersuchungen beim Seedamm. In: Mitteilungen des Historischen Vereins des Kantons Schwyz, Volume 96, Schwyz 2004.

References

External links 

 

Prehistoric pile dwellings in Switzerland
Freienbach
Lake Zurich
Cultural property of national significance in the canton of Schwyz
Archaeological sites in Switzerland